This is a list of lists on the cities of present-day nations, states and dependencies. Countries are listed in bold under their respective pages, whereas territories and dependencies are not. Disputed and unrecognized countries are italicized.



A 

 List of cities in Afghanistan - Islamic Republic of Afghanistan
 List of cities in Albania - Republic of Albania
 List of cities in Algeria - People's Democratic Republic of Algeria
 List of cities in Andorra - Principality of Andorra
 List of cities in Angola - Republic of Angola
 List of cities in Antigua and Barbuda - Antigua and Barbuda
 List of cities in Argentina - Argentine Republic
 List of cities in Armenia - Republic of Armenia
 List of cities in Aruba - Aruba (Dutch crown dependency)
  List of cities in Australia - Commonwealth of Australia
 List of cities in Austria - Republic of Austria
 List of cities in Azerbaijan - Republic of Azerbaijan

B 

 List of cities in the Bahamas - Commonwealth of The Bahamas
 List of cities in Bahrain - Kingdom of Bahrain
 List of cities in Bangladesh - People's Republic of Bangladesh
 List of cities in Barbados - Barbados
 List of cities in Belarus - Republic of Belarus
 List of cities in Belgium - Kingdom of Belgium
 List of cities in Belize - Belize
 List of cities in Benin - Republic of Benin
 List of cities in Bhutan - Kingdom of Bhutan
 List of cities in Bolivia - Plurinational State of Bolivia
 List of cities in Bosnia and Herzegovina - Bosnia and Herzegovina
 List of cities in Botswana - Republic of Botswana
 List of cities in Brazil - Federative Republic of Brazil
 List of cities in Brunei - State of Brunei Darussalam
 List of cities in Bulgaria - Republic of Bulgaria
 List of cities in Burkina Faso - Burkina Faso
 List of cities in Burundi - Republic of Burundi

C 

 List of cities in Cambodia - Kingdom of Cambodia
 List of cities in Cameroon - Republic of Cameroon
 List of cities in Canada - Canada
 List of cities in Cape Verde - Republic of Cape Verde
 List of cities in the Cayman Islands - Cayman Islands (UK overseas territory)
 List of cities in the Central African Republic - Central African Republic
 List of cities in Chad - Republic of Chad
 List of cities in Chile - Republic of Chile
 List of cities in China - People's Republic of China
 List of cities in Colombia - Republic of Colombia
 List of cities in Comoros - Union of the Comoros
 List of cities in the Democratic Republic of the Congo - Democratic Republic of the Congo
 List of cities in the Republic of the Congo - Republic of the Congo
 List of cities in Costa Rica - Republic of Costa Rica
 List of cities in Côte d'Ivoire - Republic of Côte d'Ivoire
 List of cities in Croatia - Republic of Croatia
 List of cities in Cuba - Republic of Cuba
 List of cities in Cyprus - Republic of Cyprus
 List of cities in the Czech Republic - Czech Republic

D 

 List of cities in Denmark - Kingdom of Denmark
 List of cities in Djibouti - Republic of Djibouti
 List of cities in Dominica - Commonwealth of Dominica
 List of cities in the Dominican Republic - Dominican Republic

E 

 List of cities in East Timor (Timor-Leste) - Democratic Republic of Timor-Leste
 List of cities in Ecuador - Republic of Ecuador
 List of cities in Egypt - Arab Republic of Egypt
 List of cities in El Salvador - Republic of El Salvador
 List of cities in Equatorial Guinea - Republic of Equatorial Guinea
 List of cities in Eritrea - State of Eritrea
 List of cities in Estonia - Republic of Estonia
 List of cities in Eswatini (Swaziland) - Kingdom of Eswatini
 List of cities in Ethiopia - Federal Democratic Republic of Ethiopia

F 

 List of cities in the Falkland Islands - Falkland Islands (British overseas territories)
 List of cities in the Faroe Islands - Faroe Islands (Self-governing country in the Kingdom of Denmark)
 List of cities in Fiji - Republic of the Fiji Islands
 List of cities in Finland - Republic of Finland
 List of cities in France - French Republic
 List of cities in French Guiana - French Guiana (French overseas community)
 List of cities in French Polynesia - French Polynesia (French overseas community)

G 

 List of cities in Gabon - Gabonese Republic
 List of cities in the Gambia - Republic of The Gambia
See List of cities in Palestinian Authority areas for Gaza Strip 
 List of cities in Georgia - Georgia
 List of cities in Germany - Federal Republic of Germany
 List of cities in Ghana - Republic of Ghana
 List of cities in Gibraltar - Gibraltar (UK overseas territory)
 List of cities in Greece - Hellenic Republic
 List of cities in Greenland - Greenland (Self-governing country in the Kingdom of Denmark)
 List of cities in Grenada - Grenada
 List of cities in Guadeloupe - Guadeloupe (French overseas community)
 List of cities in Guam - Territory of Guam (US overseas territory)
 List of cities in Guatemala - Republic of Guatemala
 List of cities in Guinea - Republic of Guinea
 List of cities in Guinea-Bissau - Republic of Guinea-Bissau
 List of cities in Guyana - Co-operative Republic of Guyana

H 

 List of cities in Haiti - Republic of Haiti
 List of cities in Honduras - Republic of Honduras
 List of cities in Hong Kong - Hong Kong Special Administrative Region of the People's Republic of China (Area of special sovereignty)
 List of cities in Hungary - Republic of Hungary

I 

 List of cities in Iceland - Republic of Iceland
 List of cities in India - Republic of India
 List of cities in Indonesia - Republic of Indonesia
 List of cities in Iran - Islamic Republic of Iran
 List of cities in Iraq - Republic of Iraq
 List of cities in Ireland - Ireland

See List of cities in the Falkland Islands for Islas Malvinas 
 List of cities in the Isle of Man - Isle of Man (British Crown dependency)
 List of cities in Israel - State of Israel
 List of cities in Italy - Italian Republic

J 

 List of cities in Jamaica - Jamaica
 List of cities in Japan - Japan
 List of cities in Jersey - Jersey (British crown dependency)
 List of cities in Jordan - Hashemite Kingdom of Jordan

K 

 List of cities in Kazakhstan - Republic of Kazakhstan
 List of cities in Kenya - Republic of Kenya
 List of cities in Kiribati - Republic of Kiribati
 List of cities in North Korea - Democratic People's Republic of Korea
 List of cities in South Korea (Republic of) - Republic of Korea
  List of cities in Kosovo - Kosovo Republic
 List of cities in Kuwait - State of Kuwait
 List of cities in Kyrgyzstan - Kyrgyz Republic

L 

 List of cities in Laos - Lao People's Democratic Republic
 List of cities in Latvia - Republic of Latvia
 List of cities in Lebanon - Republic of Lebanon
 List of cities in Lesotho - Kingdom of Lesotho
 List of cities in Liberia - Republic of Liberia
 List of cities in Libya - Great Socialist People's Libyan Arab Jamahiriya
 List of cities in Liechtenstein - Principality of Liechtenstein
 List of cities in Lithuania - Republic of Lithuania
 List of cities in Luxembourg - Grand Duchy of Luxembourg

M 

 List of cities in Madagascar - Republic of Madagascar
 List of cities in Malawi - Republic of Malawi
 List of cities in Malaysia - Malaysia
 List of cities in the Maldives - Republic of Maldives
 List of cities in Mali - Republic of Mali
 List of cities in Malta - Republic of Malta
 List of cities in the Marshall Islands - Republic of the Marshall Islands
 List of cities in Mauritania - Islamic Republic of Mauritania
 List of cities in Mauritius - Republic of Mauritius
 List of cities in Mayotte - Mayotte (French overseas community)
 List of cities in Mexico - United Mexican States
 List of cities in the Federated States of Micronesia - Federated States of Micronesia
 List of cities in Moldova - Republic of Moldova
 List of cities in Monaco - Principality of Monaco
 List of cities in Mongolia - Mongolia
 List of cities in Montenegro - Republic of Montenegro
 List of cities in Montserrat - Montserrat (UK overseas territory)
 List of cities in Morocco - Kingdom of Morocco
 List of cities in Mozambique - Republic of Mozambique
 List of cities in Myanmar - Republic of the Union of Myanmar

N 

 List of cities in Namibia - Republic of Namibia
 List of cities in Nauru - Republic of Nauru
 List of cities in Nepal - Federal Democratic Republic of Nepal
 List of cities in the Netherlands - Kingdom of the Netherlands
 List of cities in the Netherlands Antilles - Netherlands Antilles (Self-governing country in the Kingdom of the Netherlands)
 List of cities in New Caledonia - Territory of New Caledonia and Dependencies (French community sui generis)
 List of cities in New Zealand - New Zealand
 List of cities in Nicaragua - Republic of Nicaragua
 List of cities in Niger - Republic of Niger
 List of cities in Nigeria - Federal Republic of Nigeria
 List of cities in Niue - Niue (Associated state of New Zealand)
 List of cities in Northern Cyprus - Turkish Republic of Northern Cyprus
 List of cities in the Northern Mariana Islands - Commonwealth of the Northern Mariana Islands (US overseas commonwealth)
 List of cities in North Macedonia - North Macedonia
 List of cities in Norway - Kingdom of Norway

O 

 List of cities in Oman - Sultanate of Oman

P 

  List of cities in Pakistan - Islamic Republic of Pakistan
 List of cities in Palau - Republic of Palau
 List of cities in Palestine - State of Palestine
 List of cities in Panama - Republic of Panama
 List of cities in Papua New Guinea - Independent State of Papua New Guinea
 List of cities in Paraguay - Republic of Paraguay
 List of cities in Peru - Republic of Peru
 List of cities in the Philippines - Republic of the Philippines
 List of cities in the Pitcairn Islands - Pitcairn, Henderson, Ducie, and Oeno Islands (UK overseas territory)
 List of cities in Poland - Republic of Poland
 List of cities in Portugal - Portuguese Republic
 List of cities in Puerto Rico - Commonwealth of Puerto Rico (US overseas commonwealth)

Q 

 List of cities in Qatar - State of Qatar

R 

 List of cities in Romania - Romania
 List of cities in Russia - Russian Federation
 List of cities in Rwanda - Republic of Rwanda

S 

 List of cities in Saint Kitts and Nevis - Federation of Saint Christopher and Nevis
 List of cities in Saint Lucia - Saint Lucia
 List of cities in Saint-Pierre and Miquelon - Saint Pierre and Miquelon (French overseas community)
 List of cities in Saint Vincent and the Grenadines - Saint Vincent and the Grenadines
 List of cities in Samoa - Independent State of Samoa
 List of cities in San Marino - Most Serene Republic of San Marino
 List of cities in São Tomé and Príncipe - Democratic Republic of São Tomé and Príncipe
 List of cities in Saudi Arabia - Kingdom of Saudi Arabia
 List of cities in Senegal - Republic of Senegal
 List of cities in Serbia - Republic of Serbia
 List of cities in Seychelles - Republic of Seychelles
 List of cities in Sierra Leone - Republic of Sierra Leone
 List of cities in Singapore - Republic of Singapore
 List of cities in Slovakia - Slovak Republic
 List of cities in Slovenia - Republic of Slovenia
 List of cities in the Solomon Islands - Solomon Islands
 List of cities in Somalia - Federal Republic of Somalia
 List of cities in Somaliland - Republic of Somaliland
 List of cities in South Africa - Republic of South Africa
 List of cities in South Ossetia - Republic of South Ossetia
 List of cities in South Sudan - Republic of South Sudan
 List of cities in Spain - Kingdom of Spain
 List of cities in Sri Lanka - Democratic Socialist Republic of Sri Lanka
 List of cities in Sudan - Republic of the Sudan
 List of cities in Suriname - Republic of Suriname
 List of cities in Svalbard - Svalbard (Territory of Norway)
 List of cities in Sweden - Kingdom of Sweden
 List of cities in Switzerland - Swiss Confederation
 List of cities in Syria - Syrian Arab Republic

T 

 List of cities in Taiwan - Republic of China
 List of cities in Tajikistan - Republic of Tajikistan
 List of cities in Tanzania - United Republic of Tanzania
 List of cities in Thailand - Kingdom of Thailand
 List of cities in Togo - Togolese Republic
 List of villages in Tokelau - Tokelau (Territory of New Zealand)
 List of cities in Tonga - Kingdom of Tonga
 List of cities in Transnistria - Pridnestrovian Moldavian Republic
 List of cities in Trinidad and Tobago - Republic of Trinidad and Tobago
 List of cities in Tunisia - Tunisian Republic
 List of cities in Turkey - Republic of Turkey
 List of cities in Turkmenistan - Turkmenistan
 List of cities in the Turks and Caicos Islands - Turks and Caicos Islands (UK overseas territory)
 List of cities in Tuvalu - Tuvalu

U 

 List of cities in Uganda - Republic of Uganda
 List of cities in Ukraine - Ukraine
 List of cities in the United Arab Emirates - United Arab Emirates
 List of cities in the United Kingdom - United Kingdom of Great Britain and Northern Ireland
 List of cities in the United States - United States of America
 List of cities in Uruguay - Oriental Republic of Uruguay
 List of cities in Uzbekistan - Republic of Uzbekistan

V 

 List of cities in Vanuatu - Republic of Vanuatu
 Vatican City
 List of cities in Venezuela - Bolivarian Republic of Venezuela
 List of cities in Vietnam - Socialist Republic of Vietnam
 List of cities in the Virgin Islands - United States Virgin Islands (US overseas territory)

W 
See List of cities in Palestinian Authority areas for West Bank 
 List of cities in Western Sahara - Western Sahara

Y 
 List of cities in Yemen - Republic of Yemen

Z 
 List of cities in Zambia - Republic of Zambia
 List of cities in Zimbabwe - Republic of Zimbabwe

See also
 Lists by country
 Lists of cities
 List of cities in Europe by country
 List of former sovereign states
 Former countries in Europe after 1815
 List of countries

External links
 2005 city population estimates for the world